= Punta de Balasto =

Coordinates: 26°58′S 66°08′W

- Municipality and village
- Interactive map of Punta de Balasto
- Country: Argentina
- Province: Catamarca Province
- Time zone: UTC−3 (ART)

Punta de Balasto is a village and municipality in Catamarca Province in northwestern Argentina.
